Aisha Syed  is a Pakistani politician who had been a member of the National Assembly of Pakistan, from June 2013 to May 2018.

Political career

She was elected to the National Assembly of Pakistan as a candidate of Jamaat-e-Islami Pakistan on reserved seats for women from Khyber Paktunkhwa in 2013 Pakistani general election.

References

Living people
Pashtun women
Pakistani MNAs 2013–2018
Year of birth missing (living people)
Place of birth missing (living people)
Women members of the National Assembly of Pakistan
21st-century Pakistani women politicians